The G.J. George House is a historic house located at 205 W. Center St. in Fairfield, Illinois. The house was built in 1877 or 1878 for G.J. George, a Civil War veteran and local lawyer. Local architect George Chittenden designed the two-story brick house in the Italianate style. The house features porches on all four sides, including one at the front entrance; the "L"-shaped entrance porch has a balustrade along the edge of its roof. The house's tall, rectangular windows are topped by brick arches. A bracketed and dentillated cornice runs along the house's roof line. The cross-hipped roof has an iron fence along its ridge.

The house was added to the National Register of Historic Places on February 9, 2006.

References

Houses on the National Register of Historic Places in Illinois
Italianate architecture in Illinois
Houses in Wayne County, Illinois
National Register of Historic Places in Wayne County, Illinois